Bagdehi railway station is a railway station on the South Eastern Railway network in the state of Odisha, India. It serves Bagdehi village. Its code is BEH. It has three platforms. Passenger, Express and Superfast trains halt at Bagdehi railway station.

Major Trains

 Tapaswini Express
 Rourkela - Gunupur Rajya Rani Express
 Samaleshwari Express
 Ispat Express
 South Bihar Express

References

See also
 Jharsuguda District

Railway stations in Jharsuguda district
Chakradharpur railway division